Merv Walker (born November 14, 1952) is a Canadian football player who played professionally for the Winnipeg Blue Bombers, Calgary Stampeders, Toronto Argonauts and Hamilton Tiger-Cats.

References

1952 births
Living people
Winnipeg Blue Bombers players
Calgary Stampeders players
Toronto Argonauts players
Hamilton Tiger-Cats players
Players of Canadian football from Ontario
Canadian football people from Toronto